The Chief Judge of the High Court of Hong Kong (CJHC) is the head of the High Court of Hong Kong and the President of the Court of Appeal of Hong Kong. In the Hong Kong order of precedence, the Chief Judge is the second most senior administrative judge for the courts system, second only to the Chief Justice of the Court of Final Appeal of Hong Kong. The position of Chief Judge is the broad equivalent of the Master of the Rolls in the courts system of England and Wales.

Jeremy Poon is the 5th and current Chief Judge of the High Court of Hong Kong, having taken up the post in December 2019.

Background 
The Chief Judge heads the High Court of Hong Kong, which deals with criminal and civil cases that have risen beyond the lower courts. While the High Court consists of the Court of Appeal and the Court of First Instance, the Chief Judge himself generally only presides over appellate cases in the Court of Appeal, usually together with two other Justices of Appeal. The Chief Judge sits alone in the Court of First Instance to hear contested applications for the ad hoc admission of overseas counsel to the Hong Kong Bar.

In accordance with the Basic Law, the Chief Judge is appointed by the Chief Executive based on the recommendation of the Judicial Officers Recommendation Commission (JORC), and made official after receiving approval from the Legislative Council. The Chief Judge, along with the Chief Justice, is one of two positions in the Hong Kong Judiciary that has a nationality requirement (no dual nationality allowed).

Duties of the Chief Judge 
The Chief Judge is the Court Leader of the High Court and the President of the Court of Appeal, and is responsible for ensuring the 'efficient utilisation of judicial resources and court time, for advising the Chief Justice on matters of policy concerning the operation and development of the High Court'.  

From a judicial stand point, the role of the Chief Judge is equivalent to a Justice of Appeal (but with a seniority ahead of both a Justice of Appeal or a Vice-President), and comes with significant additional administrative responsibilities. This may lead to justices turning down the appointment; for example, after Andrew Cheung's promotion to the Court of Final Appeal, it was reported that the Chief Justice originally asked Johnson Lam to be Chief Judge. However, citing the increase in administrative responsibilities, he turned down this role, which ultimately went to Jeremy Poon. Geoffrey Ma, when he was Chief Judge, stated that he spent "less than 50% of his time in court" as most of his time was consumed over administrative issues. Former Hong Kong Bar Association chairman Ronny Tong SC also said of the post: "The job of the chief judge is mainly administrative and not much relating to giving judgments. So whether the candidate is conservative or not does not matter."

The Chief Judge has the power to admit barristers and solicitors and for implementing Civil Justice Reform. Given the experience of balancing hearing appeals and administrative responsibilities, they are often seen as prime candidates for elevation to the role of Chief Justice.

Acting Chief Judge 
During a period of absence, an Acting Chief Judge of the High Court is appointed 'until the vacancy therein is filled'. In general, a Vice-President of the Court of Appeal is appointed as Acting Chief Judge of the High Court, while a Justice of Appeal may also be appointed during this period if necessary.

Chief Judges of the High Court 

For pre-1997 Chief Justices (equivalent to the present day Chief Judge of the High Court), see Chief Justice of the Supreme Court of Hong Kong

See also 
 High Court of Hong Kong
 Court of Appeal of Hong Kong
Court of First Instance of Hong Kong
 Chief Justice of the Supreme Court of Hong Kong
 Vice-Presidents of the Court of Appeal of Hong Kong
Court of Final Appeal (Hong Kong)
 Chief Justice of the Court of Final Appeal of Hong Kong
 Legal system of Hong Kong

References 

Hong Kong judges